Eupterote fabia is a moth in the family Eupterotidae. It was described by Pieter Cramer in 1780. It is found in India, Sri Lanka and Bhutan.

The wingspan is 90–130 mm. The ground colour of the adults is bright yellow.

The larvae feed on the leaves of cardamom and coffee.

Subspecies
Eupterote fabia fabia
Eupterote fabia acuminalba van Eecke, 1924
Eupterote fabia asemos Bryk, 1950
Eupterote fabia ochripicta Moore, 1879 (Sri Lanka)

References

Moths described in 1780
Eupterotinae